Pollock Park is a cricket ground in Lurgan, Northern Ireland. In 1999, the ground hosted a first-class match between Ireland and the touring South Africa Academy team, with the match ending in a draw.  In 2005, the ground hosted two List A matches in the 2005 ICC Trophy. The first of these was between Uganda and the United States, which resulted in a Ugandan victory by 6 wickets,  The second saw Uganda play the UAE, which resulted in a 63 run victory for the UAE.

References

External links
Pollock Park, Lurgan at CricketArchive

Cricket grounds in Northern Ireland
Lurgan
Sports venues in County Armagh